Manuel Ortiz (1938–2017) was an American pastor, professor, and writer, best known for teaching at Westminster Theological Seminary and for founding Spirit and Truth Fellowship, a multiethnic church in Philadelphia.

Biography
Manuel Ortiz was born in New York City in 1938 to parents who had recently migrated from Puerto Rico. He grew up in Spanish Harlem. While Ortiz was raised in the Roman Catholic Church, he converted to Evangelical Christianity in young adulthood. After serving in the United States Marine Corps, Ortiz attended Philadelphia College of the Bible, graduating in 1972. He moved to Chicago and did graduate work at Wheaton College, and began to engage in his lifelong passion for urban ministry. He was involved in the founding of several churches and schools in Chicago, Philadelphia, and Puerto Rico. In 1987 he returned to Philadelphia where he earned his Doctor of Ministry (D.Min.) degree at Westminster Theological Seminary.  He stayed at Westminster and taught there for almost 20 years, while at the same time planting and pastoring the urban and multiethnic congregation Spirit and Truth Fellowship, a ministry of the Christian Reformed Church in North America. He was a prolific writer, publishing many articles and several books.  After his retirement from Westminster in 2008, Ortiz taught and worked at nearby Biblical Theological Seminary, where he retired in 2016.  He died from Pulmonary Fibrosis on February 8, 2017.

Publications
 The Hispanic Challenge: Opportunities Confronting the Church (InterVarsity Press, 1994)
 One New People: Models for Developing a Multiethnic Church (Intervarsity Press, 2010)
 The Urban Face of Mission: Ministering the Gospel in a Diverse and Changing World (with Harvie Conn and Susan Baker) (P&R Publishing, 2002)
 Urban Ministry: The Kingdom, the City and the People of God (coauthored with Harvie Conn) (Intervarsity Press, 2010)

References

1938 births
2017 deaths
American conservationists
Wheaton College (Illinois) alumni
Westminster Theological Seminary alumni
Cairn University alumni
Puerto Rican religious leaders
Puerto Rican United States Marines
United States Marines
Clergy from New York City
Puerto Rican non-fiction writers
American people of Puerto Rican descent
American religion academics